III (Three) is the second studio album from Hillsong Young & Free released on 29 June 2018. Four singles were released from the album, "Love Won't Let Me Down" on 4 August 2017 "P E A C E" on 22 February 2018 "Let Go" on 18 May 2018, and "Just Jesus" on 8 June 2018. Hillsong Young and Free released a live recording of the album from Hillsong Conference 2018, III (Live at Hillsong Conference); an acoustic version of the album on 5 April 2019, III (Studio Sessions); and a remixed version of the album on 5 September 2019, III (Reimagined).

Background 
"Love Won't Let Me Down" was released as the first single on 4 August 2017. The Love Won't Let Me Down EP was released on 16 February 2018 while "P E A C E" was released as a single on 22 February 2018 with the background story uploaded to the band's YouTube channel on 27 February 2018 followed by a studio performance of the song on 17 March 2018 and a "message and meaning of P E A C E" on 21 March 2018. On 18 May 2018 they released "Let Go" as their third single. They released "Just Jesus" as their fourth single on 8 June 2018.

Executive producer and featured worship leader Laura Toggs stated that the goal of the project was to have "a collection of personal songs, written and sung from profound devotions and life wrestles over the last three years" where, as a group they were "discovering greater depths and devoting ourselves completely to our faith in Jesus." Producer and featured worship leader-songwriter Aodhan King  added that it was an attempt to reflect their members' growth in faith.

Track listing

Live recording 

On 2 November 2018, a live recording of the album was released. The album was recorded at Hillsong Conference, Sydney on 12 July 2018. A film recording of all 16 songs was released at the same time on YouTube, Apple Music and Hillsong Channel Now.

Track listing

Studio Sessions 

On 5 April 2019, an acoustic recording of nine songs from the III album was released via Hillsong Music Australia and Capitol CMG.

Track listing

Reimagined 

On 5 September 2019, a reimagined version of eleven songs from the III album was released via Hillsong Music Australia and Capitol CMG.

Track listing

Charts

Studio album

Live album

Accolades 

The video for "Love Won't Let Me Down", from III, was nominated for a 2018 GMA Dove Award in the Short Form Video of the Year category.

References

2018 albums
Hillsong Young & Free albums